Dotun Akinsanya (born 20 January 1981) is a Nigerian badminton player. He won the silver medals in the men's doubles and mixed team event, also the bronze medal in the men's singles at the 2003 All-Africa Games. Akinsanya later captured the gold medal in 2007 All-Africa Games in the mixed team event.

In 2002, he represented his country at the 2002 Manchester Commonwealth Games. In 2003, he received a scholarship from the Olympic Solidarity's Youth Development Program with a partnership with International Badminton Federation, for preparations of talented youngsters for future Olympic Games, specifically the Beijing 2008 Olympics. Although won the 2004 African Championships, he failed to qualify at the 2004 Olympic Games, after his world ranking down to South African player.

Achievements

All-Africa Games 
Men's singles

Men's doubles

African Championships 
Men's singles

Men's doubles

IBF International 
Men's doubles

References

External links 
 

1981 births
Living people
Nigerian male badminton players
Badminton players at the 2002 Commonwealth Games
Commonwealth Games competitors for Nigeria
Competitors at the 2003 All-Africa Games
Competitors at the 2007 All-Africa Games
African Games gold medalists for Nigeria
African Games silver medalists for Nigeria
African Games bronze medalists for Nigeria
African Games medalists in badminton
21st-century Nigerian people